ACM Transactions on Applied Perception (ACM TAP) is a quarterly peer-reviewed scientific journal covering interdisciplinary computer science topics relevant to psychology and perception. It was established in 2004 by Erik Reinhard and Heinrich Buelthoff and is published by the Association for Computing Machinery. In 2016, the ACM Publications Board agreed to offer journal publication to the strongest submissions to the ACM Symposium on Applied Perception.

The editor-in-chief is Bobby Bodenheimer (Vanderbilt University). According to the Journal Citation Reports, the journal had a 2020 impact factor of 1.550.

References

External links

Association for Computing Machinery academic journals
Quarterly journals
Publications established in 2004
English-language journals
Computer science journals
Perception journals